Abu Hajirat Khuatana or Abu Hujayrat Khawatinah is a village near al-Hawl in eastern al-Hasakah Governorate, northeastern Syria.

Administratively the village belongs to the al-Hawl Nahiya of al-Hasakah District. At the 2004 census, it had a population of 1,774.

History
In the Syrian Civil War, the area was occupied by the Islamic State.  The village was however liberated on 15 November 2015 by the Syrian Democratic Forces in the course of their al-Hawl offensive.

References

Villages in Syria